Delivery performance (DP) is a broadly used standard KPI measurement in supply chains to measure the fulfillment of a customers demand to the wish date. Following the nomenclature of the DR-DP-Matrix three main approaches to measure DP can be distinguished:

Type of measurement: volume (V)/singular(S)
Type of view: on time (T)/ delivery (D)

Volume/on time

Formula
If
 = 
Else
NULL

Demand:= customers wish
c:= product identifier
p:= Time period e.g. a day, a week, a month ...

The cumulation over a period and a group of product identifiers c is done as follows:

whereas p is determined by demand period

Singular/delivery and singular/on time

Singular case definition
To fit to the needs of the environment, the granularity of a singular case has to be defined. In general a singular case is described by a n-Tuple consisting of a set of the following order and delivery details:
 order number
 customer identifier
 product identifier
 wish date of customer
 confirmed date of supplier
 ship to information
 delivery date
 delivery note number

Formula

After a singular case has been delivered to the customer its DP is measured as follows:
If (wish date = arrival date) then
 DPsingular case=1
else
 DPsingular case=0

arrival date = delivery date + transit time

By cumulating the results of singular cases over a certain period p and, if necessary, additional criteria c (e.g. customer, product, ...) the delivery performance is calculated as follows:

whereas p is determined by the arrival date

After a period has elapsed all singular cases with wish date within period are considered and their DP is measured as follows:
If (wish date = arrival date) then
 DRsingular case=1
else
 DRsingular case=0

arrival date = delivery date + transit time

By cumulating the results of singular cases over a certain period p and, if necessary, additional criteria c (e.g. customer, product, ...) the delivery performance is calculated as follows:

whereas p is determined by the first confirmed date

Result

0%≤≤100%

References

See also

Delivery reliability

Supply chain management